Darrick is a given name. Notable people with the name include:

Darrick Brilz (born 1964), former American football offensive lineman
Darrick Brown (born 1984), American football cornerback
Darrick Brownlow (born 1968), American football linebacker
Darrick Doerner, big wave pioneer in the sport of towsurfing
Darrick Forrest (born 1999), American football player
Darrick Martin (born 1971), American retired professional basketball player
Darrick Vaughn (born 1978), former American football defensive back

See also

Derek
Derrick (name)